Episteira is a genus of moths in the family Geometridae described by Warren in 1899.

Species
 Episteira africana (Aurivillius, 1910)
 Episteira atrospila (Strand, 1915)
 Episteira colligata Warren, 1899
 Episteira confusidentata (Warren, 1897)
 Episteira frustrata L B. Prout, 1935
 Episteira mouliniei Legrand, 1971
 Episteira nigrilinearia (Leech, 1897)
 Episteira protima (Turner, 1907)

References

Trichopterygini